Prabhasa monastyrskii is a moth of the family Erebidae first described by Vladimir Viktorovitch Dubatolov in 2012. It is found in Vietnam.

The length of the forewings is about 9.5 mm. The forewings are dark grey with a lighter costal margin and a dark shadow beyond the discal cell. The hindwings are brownish grey, with lighter bases.

References

Moths described in 2012
Lithosiina